Crémazie station is a Montreal Metro station in Montreal, Quebec, Canada. It is operated by the Société de transport de Montréal (STM) and serves the Orange Line. It is located on the border between the boroughs of Ahuntsic-Cartierville and Villeray–Saint-Michel–Parc-Extension The station opened October 14, 1966, as part of the original Metro network.

Overview
The station, designed by Adalbert Niklewicz, is a normal side platform station, built in tunnel. A large volume serves as the transept, with three of the four platform stairways in enclosed tunnels. The mezzanine serves two entrances, one on each side of the Autoroute Métropolitaine, and both integrated into buildings; the northern access has doors both in front of and behind the building.

A large ceramic mural by Georges Lauda, Paul Pannier, and Gérard Cordeau, Le poète dans l'univers ("the poet in the universe"), is located on the wall of the large volume, over the Montmorency platform. It commemorates three famous Quebec poets, Octave Crémazie, Émile Nelligan, and Hector de Saint-Denys Garneau, represented by wrought iron masks on the mural.

Origin of the name
This station is named for Crémazie Boulevard, in turn commemorating Octave Crémazie (1827–1879), one of Quebec's most important poets and the author of "Le Drapeau de Carillon." The street was so named in 1914.

Connecting bus routes

Nearby points of interest
Complexe FTQ
Collège Ahuntsic
Collège André-Grasset
Complexe sportif Claude-Robillard
Centre Rockland

References

External links
Crémazie Station — official site
Montreal by Metro, metrodemontreal.com — photos, information, and trivia
 2011 STM System Map
 Metro Map

Orange Line (Montreal Metro)
Ahuntsic-Cartierville
Villeray–Saint-Michel–Parc-Extension
Railway stations in Canada opened in 1966